The School of Panamerican Unrest (La Escuela Panamericana del Desasosiego) is a conceptual art project led by Mexican artist Pablo Helguera. The project involves a series of performances, discussions and screenings to seek connections between the different regions of the Americas. The core of the project consisted of a travelling schoolhouse which made 30 stops between the U.S. state of Alaska and Chile's Antártica Chilena province between May and September 2006, following the entire length of the Pan-American Highway. At each stop topics such as immigration, globalization and the role of art in society were examined as they relate to Pan-American culture, history and ideology. The project echoes the efforts of intellectuals such as José Marti, Simón Bolívar and José Vasconcelos to create a unified cultural region in the Americas. The project began with an interview of Marie Smith Jones, the last living speaker of Eyak, a Native Alaskan language; and ended with an interview with Cristina Calderón, the last living speaker of Yaghan, in Puerto Williams, Tierra del Fuego.  Currently a travelling exhibition and accompanying documentary are being planned, bringing together the documentation obtained during the project.

External links
 The School of Panamerican Unrest
 SPU at Universes in Universe
 Pablo Helguera bio at Creative Capital Foundation
 Interview with Pablo Helguera at NY Arts Magazine

Mexican artists
Performances